Khafkuiyeh, also rendered as Khafgooeyeh may refer to:
Khafkuiyeh, Baft
Khafkuiyeh, Jiroft